Eastbridge Windpump is a smock mill at the Museum of East Anglian Life, Stowmarket, Suffolk, England which has been restored to working order.

History
Eastbridge Windpump was probably built in the mid nineteenth century by Robert Martin, the Beccles millwright. It originally stood at Minsmere Level, Eastbridge, Leiston. In the early 1920s, millwright Dan England of Ludham reinforced the mill by bolting the frame from a nearby smock mill, which had collapsed, over the weatherboarding. It worked by wind until 1940. After the war, an iron windpump was erected nearby to take over from Eastbridge Windpump. On 19 February 1977, Eastbridge Windpump collapsed. The remains were dismantled by members of Suffolk Mills Group in July 1977 and later incorporated into the rebuilt mill at the Museum of East Anglian Life, Stowmarket. The restoration work was done by Jameson Marshall Ltd.

Description

It has a boat-shaped cap and is winded by a fantail. The four Patent sails are carried on a cast-iron windshaft. They span . The cast-iron brake wheel drives a cast-iron wallower carried on a cast-iron upright shaft. A cast-iron crown wheel drives a three-throw plunger pump, which has cylinders  square.

Public access
Eastbridge Windpump is open to the public and may be viewed externally during normal opening times of the Museum of East Anglian Life.

References

External links
 Suffolk Mills Group webpage on Eastbridge Windpump.

Windmills in Suffolk
Smock mills in England
Windmills completed in 1979
Suffolk Coastal
Stowmarket
Tourist attractions in Suffolk
Museums in Suffolk
Octagonal buildings in the United Kingdom